AETN may refer to:

 Arkansas Educational Television Network, a Public Broadcasting System (PBS) member television stations in Arkansas
 A&E Television Networks, parent company of A&E Network and History Channel, among others